Paco van Moorsel (born 15 December 1989) is a Dutch footballer who plays as an attacking midfielder.

Career
Van Moorsel played six seasons for FC Den Bosch in the Eerste Divisie before he joined FC Groningen in the summer of 2012. He was sent on loan to SC Cambuur during the 2013–14 season and again to NEC the following season.

On 26 June 2019, FC Den Bosch announced, that van Moorsel had returned to the club on a 2-year contract with an option for one further year.

Honours

Club
N.E.C.
Eerste Divisie: 2014–15

Sparta Rotterdam
 Eerste Divisie: 2015–16

References

External links
 
 

1989 births
Living people
People from Veldhoven
Dutch footballers
Association football forwards
FC Den Bosch players
FC Groningen players
SC Cambuur players
NEC Nijmegen players
Sparta Rotterdam players
Go Ahead Eagles players
Eredivisie players
Eerste Divisie players